Allison Hagendorf (born November 14, 1979) is the host of The Allison Hagendorf Show, a television personality, and music journalist, known for hosting the New Year's Eve broadcast from Times Square from 2012 to 2019. She was also the Global Head of Rock for Spotify.

References

External links

Video Podcast "The ALLISON HAGENDORF Show"
Audio Podcast "The ALLISON HAGENDORF Show"
Spotify Show "Rock This With Allison Hagendorf

Living people
American music journalists
American television personalities
American women television personalities
American voice actresses
1979 births
21st-century American women